The Henry Shaw Ozark Corridor is a long string of adjoining conservation areas in the US state of Missouri, running  along Interstate 44 and  along the Meramec River. The corridor is named after Henry Shaw, founder of the Missouri Botanical Garden.

The Henry Shaw Ozark Corridor Foundation is an organization founded officially in 1994 to preserve the Ozark foothills along Interstate 44 and promote maintenance and expansion of the Ozark Corridor series of parks.

Protected areas in the Henry Shaw Ozark Corridor include:

Allenton Access
Antire Valley County Park
Beaumont Scout Reservation
Buder Park
Castlewood State Park
Catawissa Conservation Area
Emmenegger Nature Park
Forest 44 Conservation Area
Forest Staley County Park
George Winter Park
Greensfelder County Park
Greentree Park
LaBarque Creek Conservation Area
Lone Elk County Park
Myron and Sonya Glassberg Family Conservation Area
Pacific Palisades Conservation Area
Packwood Park
Possum Woods Conservation Area
Powder Valley Conservation Nature Center
Riverside Park
Robertsville State Park
Rockwoods Range Conservation Area
Rockwoods Reservation
Route 66 State Park
Simpson Park
Shaw Nature Reserve
Tyson Research Center
Unger Park
West Tyson County Park
Young Conservation Area

External links
 Henry Shaw Ozark Corridor at the North American Association for Environmental Education (NAAEE).
 Article and Henry Shaw Ozark Corridor map

Landmarks in Missouri
Protected areas of Missouri
Protected areas of St. Louis County, Missouri
Protected areas of Jefferson County, Missouri
Protected areas of Franklin County, Missouri
1994 establishments in Missouri